The Hatyaiwittayalai School is a high school in Hat Yai, Songkhla, Thailand.

Curriculum

References
http://www.hatyaiwit.ac.th/

Schools in Thailand